Renmin Road Subdistrict  is a subdistrict situated in Baiyin District, Baiyin, Gansu, China. , it administers the following six residential neighborhoods:
Renmin Road Community 
Zhongxin Street Community
Wuxing Street Community
Wuyi Street Community
Xicun Community
Shuichuan Road Community

See also
List of township-level divisions of Gansu

References

Township-level divisions of Gansu
Baiyin
Subdistricts of the People's Republic of China